SSSR may refer to:
Soyuz Sovetskikh Sotsialisticheskikh Respublik, the Latin alphabet transliteration of Союз Советских Социалистических Республик (СССР), the Russian name of the Soviet Union
Society for the Scientific Study of Reading, a learned society promoting the study of reading and literacy
Society for the Scientific Study of Religion, a learned society for a social scientific perspective on religious institutions and experiences
Smallest Set of Smallest Rings, a cheminformatics term for the minimal cycle basis of a molecular graph

See also
 CCCP (disambiguation)
 USSR (disambiguation)